Sam Shing Hui is an area and a former fishing village in Tuen Mun, Tuen Mun District, Hong Kong.

See also

 Sam Shing Estate
 Tuen Mun Road
 Tuen Mun San Hui
 So Kwun Wat

Tuen Mun
Villages in Tuen Mun District, Hong Kong